Dedovshchina (lit. reign of grandfathers) is the informal practice of hazing and abuse of junior conscripts historically in the Soviet Armed Forces and today in the Russian armed forces, Internal Troops, and to a much lesser extent FSB, Border Guards, as well as in other armed forces and special services of  former Soviet Republics. It consists of brutalization by more senior conscripts, NCOs, and officers.

Dedovshchina encompasses a variety of subordinating and humiliating activities undertaken by the junior ranks, from doing the chores of the senior ranks, to violent and sometimes deadly physical and psychological abuse, not unlike an extremely vicious form of bullying or torture, including sexual torture and anal rape. There have been occasions where soldiers have been seriously injured or killed.

Etymology
The term is derived from "ded" (meaning grandfather), which is the Russian Army slang equivalent of gramps, meaning soldiers after their third (or fourth, which is also known as "dembel" ( or "DMB" ) half-year of compulsory service, stemming from a vulgarization of the word "demobilization" ( demobilizatsiya) – this word is erroneously used by soldiers to describe the act of resigning from the army); soldiers also refer to "dembel"  half-year of conscription, with the suffix -shchina which denotes a type of order, rule, or regime (compare Yezhovshchina, Zhdanovshchina). Thus, it can literally be translated as "rule of the grandfathers". This is essentially a folk system of seniority based on stage of service, mostly not backed by code or law, which only grants seniority to conscripts promoted to various sergeant and yefreitor ranks.

History

Having existed in some military schools of the Russian Empire, including the Page Corps.

The origin of this problem is often attributed to the change in conscription term brought about by the law of 12 October 1967, causing two different groups of conscripts to be simultaneously present in the army: those who were drafted for three-year service and those only for two-year service. However, A.D. Glotochkin researched psychological problems of young soldiers  before 1967.

During the same year, a decision was reached to draft conscripts with a criminal history into the ranks, due to a demographic crisis following World War II. While oppression by older conscripts has probably always taken place in the army, after that date, with the introduction of the four-class system (created by the bi-annual call-ups) it became systematic and developed its own rules and ranks.

Current situation
Many young men are killed or commit suicide every year because of dedovshchina. The New York Times reported that in 2006 at least 292 Russian soldiers were killed by dedovshchina (although the Russian military only admits that 16 soldiers were directly murdered by acts of dedovshchina and claims that the rest committed suicide). The Times states: "On Aug. 4, it was announced by the chief military prosecutor that there had been 3,500 reports of abuse already this year (2006), compared with 2,798 in 2005". The BBC meanwhile reports that in 2007, 341 soldiers committed suicide, a 15% reduction on the previous year.

Union of the Committees of Soldiers' Mothers of Russia works to protect the rights of young soldiers.

In 2012, a draftee from Chelyabinsk region, Ruslan Aiderkhanov, was tortured to death by his seniors. The one witness who was willing to testify against the alleged perpetrators, Danil Chalkin, was later found shot dead in his military base. A contract soldier, Alikbek Musabekov, was later arrested in this incident.

In 2019, according to the Russian military prosecutor office the situation with dedovshchina is getting worse. Incidents of hazing in the army during 2019 have increased. 51,000 human rights violations and 1,521 sexual assault cases. In the same year, Ramil Shamsutdinov shot 10 of his colleagues at a Gorny military base, 8 of them fatally. In court, he alleged that he was subjected to beatings and threats of anal rape.

Government actions
Overall, the Russian state has tried and has had mixed results in curtailing dedovshchina. In 2003, on the specific issues of denial of food and poor nutrition, Deputy Minister of Defence V. Isakov denied the existence of such problems.

Since 2005, the Russian Ministry of Defence has published monthly statistics of incidents and crimes including cases of death.

Russia has changed some of the rules made in 1967. Most notably, criminals are no longer accepted into the army.

Beginning in 2007/08, the conscript service time was reduced from two years to one; dedovshchina primarily occurs when second year conscripts abuse first year conscripts so this measure is partially intended to curtail the practice.

In 2011, the Russian Ministry of Defence established a military police force as a way to counter dedovshchina. According to Russian media reports, up to 20,000 service members may be assigned to serve as military police.

Dedovshchina in popular culture
Several Soviet and Russian films portrayed the dedovshchina despite the military's abstention from helping the production. Following is the selected filmography:
Do It — One! – Делай — раз! – 1990 
The Guard – Караул – 1990
Afghan Breakdown – Афганский излом – 1990
100 Days Before the Command – Сто дней до приказа – 1990
Air Hunger – Кислородный голод – 1992
The Green Elephant – Зеленый слоник – 1999
Demobbed – ДМБ – 2000
The 9th Company – 9-я рота – 2005
The Search – 2014
Also, in the novel The Hunt for Red October, Tom Clancy writes that veteran Soviet naval captain Marko Ramius refused to allow dedovshchina to be practiced anywhere on his boat, dismissing it as "low-level terrorism".

See also
 Andrey Sychyov
 Bullying in the military
 Fagging
 Inside the Soviet Army Ragging
 Military sexual trauma

References

Further reading
 
 Conscript's Prostitution Claims Shed Light On Hazing
 Military Conscripts Caught In Deadly 'Cycle Of Violence'
 Thousands Dodge Military Service as Draft Begins
Army Cracks Down On Military Service Loophole
 Russian Officer Kicks Soldier To Death
 Dmitry Puchkov about dedovschina: Oper.ru Oper.ru 
 Book by Yury Polyakov (Ю́рий Миха́йлович Поляко́в): Сто дней до приказа ("One Hundred Days Till the Release Order", written in 1980, but was only able to be published in 1987). One of the first books to discuss this taboo subject, only publishable after Perestroika. A film based on the book and bearing the same title also came out in 1990. (In Russian)
  Michael S. Coffey (2022) The Dedovshchina Abides: How Discipline Problems Endure Despite Years of Military Reform, Journal of Slavic Military Studies, 35:3-4, 283-299, DOI: 10.1080/13518046.2022.2156080 
 Oleg Divov, 2007, "Oruzhiye vozmezdiya" (Оружие возмездия, Weapon of vengeance)
 Françoise Daucé, Elisabeth Sieca-Kozlowski: Dedovshchina in the Post-Soviet Military: Hazing of Russian Army Conscripts in a Comparative Perspective. (Foreword by Dale Herspring) Soviet & Post-Soviet Politics & Society 28, Ibidem: Stuttgart 2006, .
 Golts, Alexander. "The Social and Political Condition of the Russian Military." In The Russian Military: Power and Policy, edited by Steven E. Miller and Dmitri Trenin, 73–94. Cambridge: The MIT Press, 2004. .
 Sakwa, Richard. Russian Politics and Society'', 4th ed. New York: Routledge, 2008. .
Special Issue on Dedovshchina The Journal of Power Institutions in Post-Soviet States. 1/2004.
Hazing in the Belarusian army Belarus Digest
The Wrongs of Passage: Inhuman and Degrading Treatment of New Recruits in the Russian Armed Forces

Abuse
Bullying
Conscription in Russia
Controversies in Russia
Corporal punishments
Hazing
Rape
Health and military
Human rights abuses in Russia
Human rights in the Soviet Union
Institutional abuse
Military justice
Military of Russia
Military of the Soviet Union
Military scandals
Military slang and jargon
Military traditions
Military education and training in Russia
Military human resource management
Post-traumatic stress disorder
Power (social and political) concepts
Scandals in Russia
Sexual abuse
Forced prostitution
Social issues in Russia
Torture in Russia
Violence against men in Europe
Violence in Russia
Vulnerable adults
Youth in Russia
Youth rights in Europe